The O-Jolle was an event on the 2008 Vintage Yachting Games program at the IJsselmeer, Netherlands. Six out of the seven scheduled races were completed. 9 sailors, on 9 boats, from 3 nations entered.

Venue overview

Race area and Course
Approximately 2 nautical miles of the coast of Medemblik two course areas (orange and yellow) were used for the 2008 edition of the Vintage Yachting Games.

For the 2008 edition of the Vintage Yachting Games four different courses were available. The O-Jolle could only use course 2.

Wind conditions 
During the 2008 Vintage Yachting Games the sailors experienced the following weather conditions:

Races

Summary 
In the O-Jolle at race area Orange only six races could be completed.

The battle for gold was severe between Henman van Eijk en Max Blom. Almost after each race the positions reversed. In the end Max took the series wit only 0.3 point to spare. Jan Krol became third.

Results 

 dnc = did not compete
 dns = did not start
 dnf = did not finish
 dsq = disqualified
 ocs = on course side
 ret = retired after finish
 Crossed out results did not count for the total result.

Daily standings

Victors

References 

 

O-Jolle